David Puig Currius (born 7 December 2001) is a Spanish professional golfer.

Amateur career
Puig had a successful junior career and played for Spain in the Junior Golf World Cup in Japan, where he won silver in 2018 and bronze in 2019. He represented Europe in the 2018 Junior Ryder Cup. Puig finished third at the 2021 European Amateur, behind Christoffer Bring and Ludvig Åberg.

In 2019, Puig enrolled at Arizona State University and started playing college golf with the Arizona State Sun Devils men's golf team. Playing in just his fifth collegiate stroke play tournament, he won the 2021 Southwestern Invitational by a record nine-strokes, and then defended his title in 2022.

Puig also played in the Arnold Palmer Cup in 2020 and 2021, finishing both events with an individual result of 3–1. He was awarded Catalan Player of the Year in 2021 by the Catalan Association of Golf Journalists. 

In 2022, Puig's Sun Devils team advanced to the final match at the NCAA Championship. He was invited to the inaugural tournament of the LIV Golf Invitational Series at Centurion Club, along with fellow amateur Ratchanon Chantananuwat.

Professional career
Puig turned professional in September 2022. He joined LIV Golf, making his first appearance as a professional in the LIV Golf Invitational Chicago, having previously played in two events as an amateur.

Amateur wins
2016 Campeonato de Catalunya U18
2017 Mediterranean Championship, Copa Nacional Puerta de Hierro
2018 Campeonato de Espana U18, Campeonato de Catalunya Absoluto, Campeonato Internacional de Espana U18
2019 Campeonato de Barcelona, Campeonato de Catalunya U18, Campeonato Abierto de Madrid
2021 Southwestern Invitational, The Amer Ari Invitational
2022 Southwestern Invitational

Source:

Team appearances
Amateur
Junior Ryder Cup (representing the Continent of Europe): 2018
Jacques Léglise Trophy (representing Continental Europe): 2018, 2019 (winners)
European Boys' Team Championship (representing Spain): 2018, 2019
European Amateur Team Championship (representing Spain): 2021, 2022
Arnold Palmer Cup (representing Europe): 2020, 2021
Summer Youth Olympics (representing Spain): 2018
Junior Golf World Cup (representing Spain): 2018, 2019
Eisenhower Trophy (representing Spain): 2022

Source:

References

Spanish male golfers
Arizona State Sun Devils men's golfers
LIV Golf players
Golfers at the 2018 Summer Youth Olympics
Golfers from Catalonia
People from Vallès Oriental
Sportspeople from the Province of Barcelona
2001 births
Living people
21st-century Spanish people